This is the discography of American singer Shaun Cassidy.

Albums

Studio albums

Live albums

Compilation albums

Music soundtrack albums

Singles

Notes

References

Discographies of American artists